PLP was a regional television station operating since September 4, 2015 as a continuation of Cosmos Ilia broadcasting in Elis and southwestern Greece. Its headquarters were in Pyrgos. It broadcast movies, music video clips and programs, including local Greek but also from the United States, Australia and the United Kingdom.

In 17 November 2022 PLP was replaced by the new Patra TV which operated from 1989 until the end of 2012 when it closed due to financial problems. However, PLP continues to broadcast online through the website of its partner since 2015, television network HellasNet.

Ownership
The company operating the station was established on February 18, 1997 and was originally named Cosmos Telecommunication, Cinematographic, Advertising, Television and Editorial S.A. Its first headquarters are located in Amaliada at Kalavryton 9. On March 23, 1998 the channel's operation was legalized under the 6564/Ε license, by the Ministry for the Press. The following year moved its headquarters to Kourogiannopoulou 19 in the same city. On 2000, its statute was modified by changing the activities and the company name to Cosmos Broadcasting, Telecommunication and Editorial S.A. while at the same time moved its headquarters to Pyrgos where it remains until today.

On 2016, its statute was modified by changing again the activities and the company name to the current as Cosmos Pelop Media S.A. which continues to manage and operate the channel under its new name Patra TV.

Logo
Its former logo would have the channel name with a black circle indicating space.

See also
List of Greek-language television channels
List of companies of Greece

References

External links

Mass media in Pyrgos, Elis
Television channels in Greece
Television channels and stations established in 1997